Tripoli Campaign may refer to:

Barbary Wars, in which the US, Sweden and Sicily fought against Tripoli, Algiers, Tunis and Morocco
Italo-Turkish War#Opening maneuver, in which Italy captured Tripoli and the Tripolitania Villayet from the Ottoman Empire
Fighting in and around Tripoli during the Second Libyan Civil War

See also
Siege of Tripoli (disambiguation)
List of wars involving Libya
List of wars involving Lebanon